Zinc Finger Protein 800 or ZNF800 is a protein that in humans is encoded by the ZNF800 gene. The specific function of ZNF800 is not yet well understood by the scientific community.

Gene

The ZNF800 gene is between 127373344bp and 127391557bp on the reverse strand of Chromosome 7, locus 7q31.33, spanning a total of 18214 base pairs. It has a predicted molecular weight of 75,235.79 g/mol and a predicted isoelectric point of 9.54. The gene codes for 7 exons and is translated into 664 amino acids. Only 4 exons are in the coding region of the gene and make up the ZNF800 protein, but there is a total of 6. Another name for ZNF800 is PP902. ZNF800 contains 6 functioning C2H2 zinc finger protein domains, a number of SNP's, and multiple experimentally-shown phosphorylation and SUMOylation sites.

Neighborhood 
ZNF800 is in the neighborhood of PAX4, which plays an important role in the differentiation and development of pancreatic islet beta cells.

Zinc finger protein family
ZNF800 is part of a large zinc finger protein family, and several other members of this family have previously been described. Zinc finger proteins have both DNA binding and metal (zinc) binding properties. They are found in the cell nucleus. When compared to other members of the zinc finger protein family, ZNF800 has only 48-34% similarity to its closest zinc finger protein relatives. However, several zinc finger regions and possible nucleotide binding sites are conserved.

Transcript
The protein is made in small amounts, potentially due to the unfavorability of its Kozak sequence as compared to that of more favorable proteins.

Protein

ZNF800 is ubiquitously expressed in at least 27 different tissues, with the largest amounts in bone marrow, testis, and lymph nodes. The ZNF800 protein contains 6 C2H2 zinc finger regions, 4 of which are conserved in paralogs, and 5 of which are conserved in orthologs of ZNF800. It also has two larger regions of unknown function, which are conserved in orthologs, and several key amino acids, the function of which in this particular protein has not yet been discovered.

Gene level regulation 

The promoter for ZNF800 was predicted to be between 127391456 bp and 127393803bp, spanning 2348 base pairs. This is located directly before the gene sequence. Several transcription factor binding sites were identified in this area. ZNF800 is expressed ubiquitously throughout the body at low levels. There does seem to be increased expression in the blood and thymus, but the evidence for this is somewhat contradictory. NCBI GEO Profiles across all tissues revealed the following expression levels in tissues throughout the body: highest expression of ZNF800 in bone marrow, liver, spleen and thymus.  In situ hybridization data of ZNF800 in the mouse brain from Allen Brain Atlas showed ubiquitous expression of ZNF800 in the brain in low levels (Figure: "Mouse Brain ZNF800 Expression").

Transcript level regulation 
Looking at the intron sequences next to the beginning and end of each exon and comparing those to favorable ones, it was found that all of the splice regions on ZNF800 are favorable. This explains why there are no shorter ZNF800 isoforms.

Protein level regulation 
Several different tools were used on ExPASy Proteomics to analyze ZNF800 for likely protein modification sites, unique composition, and localization. The composition of human ZNF800 was compared to that of the Mummichog ZNF800, which has a 46% identity to the human ZNF800. Several different programs showed that ZNF800 is likely localized to the nucleus and does not contain any trans-membrane domains. Human ZNF800 is rich in lysine and poor in glycine and tryptophan, while the mummichog ZNF800 is rich in serine. 

Multiple programs showed that ZNF800 is likely to be a nuclear protein. NetPhos  was used to predict the most likely phosphorylation sites (>0.99). These were compared to experimentally shown phosphorylation sites found on NCBI Nucleotide and matching phosphorylation sites were bolded. Experimentally shown sumoylation sites were also included. The likely sites of Phosphorilation, O-Glycosilation, Sumoylation, and O-ß-GlcNAc attachment are detailed below:

Homology / Evolution

Paralogs of ZNF800 
ZNF800 has 5 possible paralogs, however, all of these had a maximum identity of 33%, so it is unlikely they are true paralogs of ZNF800. They may just be similar because they are all zinc finger proteins and contain zinc finger binding domains. When multiple sequence alignments were made, the zinc finger binding domains were the areas with the most conservation.

Orthologs of ZNF800 
ZNF800 has homologs in trichoplax, invertebrates, fish, amphibians, reptiles, birds, and mammals. Based on the found E values of the protein with its orthologs in the aforementioned categories using NCBI Blast, ZNF800 is at least 930 Millions of years old. At first it was hypothesized that ZNF800 has an Ortholog in fungus, dating back to 1150 Millions of years ago, however, a BLAT search of the fungus sequence in the human domain gave no results, which lead to the conclusion that these sequences are not similar enough to prove they are truly related.

Interacting Proteins 
The most common transcription factors with high probability (>0.84) of binding ZNF800 promoter are shown in the figure. These were found using the ElDorado genome database on Genomatrix. 

A few potential interacting proteins (depicted in Figure "Proteins Predicted to Interact with ZNF800" on the right) were found using STRING and yscP, plague bacteria, was shown to bind ZNF800 using Y2H data.

Clinical Significance 

While there is no obvious link so far between ZNF800 and specific diseases it may cause, several studies on GEO Profiles have shown a correlation between ZNF800 and disease condition, including a correlation between increased ZNF800 expression and  chronic B-lymphocytic leukemia (ZNF800 GEO Profile 1), as well as a correlation between decreased ZNF800 expression and myotonic dystrophy type 2 (GEO Profile of ZNF800 Figure 2).

The 20 most common SNP's in the protein coding sequence of ZNF800 were analyzed, of these, the most common was still found in only 10% of the population. Of these mutations, none were in the zinc finger binding portions of ZNF800.

Suggested Reading 
Articles discussing ZNF800 are limited. There are 4 existing patents mention ZNF800 in lists of 100s-1000s, which address concepts such as “prostate cancer progression”, “progression risk of glaucoma”, “method for inducing pluripotency in human somatic cells”, and “modifying transcriptional regulatory networks in stem cells”. It is also mentioned in 27 patent applications, several of which have to do with cancer biomarkers.

References 

Zinc finger proteins